PM Narendra Modi is a 2019 Hindi-language biographical drama film directed by Omung Kumar, and written by Anirudh Chawla and Vivek Oberoi. The film is jointly produced by Suresh Oberoi, Sandip Singh, Anand Pandit, Acharya Manish under the banner of Legend Studios. The film's plot is loosely based on the life of Narendra Modi, the 14th Prime Minister of India.

Principal photography for the film began in January 2019. The soundtrack was composed by Hitesh Modak and Shashi-Khushi. The credits in the movie for lyrics were given to Javed Akhtar, Sameer, Abhendra Upadhyay, Irshad Kamil, Parry G. and Lavraj, and released by T-Series. Javed Akhtar later confirmed that he has not written any songs in the film and is shocked along with Sameer to see their names in the credits. The film was theatrically released in India on 24 May 2019. The film was panned by critics, and Oberoi's performance was criticized. It has grossed over 28.51 crore in India.

Plot 
Narendra Modi begins his career as a poor tea seller. He leaves his home at a young age, denying his marriage with Jashodaben Modi, to become a Sanyasi in the Himalayas. After his journey, he returns to Gujarat, becomes a Rashtriya Swayamsevak Sangh member and gets assigned to the Bharatiya Janata Party in 1980, after fighting back the State of Emergency imposed by Indira Gandhi in 1975. He also leads the Ekta Yatra to unite all Indians. He heads along the Indian Army and some other members, fighting against the terrorists to the Lal Chowk and plants the national flag of India.

He struggles and ground works in many areas of Gujarat to help people and gain support. Due to the teamwork of the people and the BJP members, the Party wins the Gujarat CM elections and Keshubhai Patel becomes the Chief Minister of Gujarat. Soon, he feels insecure seeing Modi's rise to fame and popularity. He forces the BJP founders- Atal Bihari Vajpayee, L. K. Advani and Murli Manohar Joshi to transfer Modi to some other place. In grief, Modi submits his resignation which is eventually declined as he had done a lot of work for the party. He was transferred to New Delhi for groundwork. He returned to Gujarat from Delhi in 2001, just a month before the events of the 2001 Gujarat earthquake. He replaced Keshubhai Patel from his position and was also chosen as the CM Candidate for the upcoming election, and he became the Chief Minister.

Just after being elected, he faced the 2002 Gujarat riots. He sought help from other state governments and from the federal government, but in vain. Due to his planning and strict law enforcement, he was successful to end the violence. Just after the riots ended, an attack on the Akshardham Temple by the terrorists again brought tensions among the communities. Finally, the tensions got solved, peace was brought amongst people, the work of reconstruction and further developments were begun. Streets were planned, roads were constructed, employment opportunities were brought, many Indian as well as international companies began to invest in Gujarat, corruption was eliminated, security was tightened, etc. By seeing his work, the BJP heads asked him to be the PM Candidate for the 2014 Indian general election. He campaigned all over India. His popularity resulted in him being prominently targeted by terrorists. He also survives an attempt made by the terrorists to assassinate him.

The film ends with Modi taking his oath as the 14th Prime Minister of India.

Cast 

Vivek Oberoi as Narendra Modi
Manoj Joshi as Amit Shah
Sheila Gore as	Sonia Gandhi
Akshat R Saluja as Joshi Chief Minister Modi's PA
Darshan Kumar as Corrupt News Reporter
Navneet Gairola as OSD to PM
Boman Irani as Ratan Tata
Barkha Sengupta as Jashodaben Modi
Aanjjan Srivastav as Atal Bihari Vajpayee
Zarina Wahab as Hiraben Modi
Suresh Oberoi as Swami Dayanand Giri, Narendra Modi's Guru in the Himalayas
Kishori Shahane as Indira Gandhi
 Bhavik Bhojak as Inspector Arjun Patel
Prashant Narayanan
Naresh Vohra as Murli Manohar Joshi
Bhavik Bhojak as Inspector Arjun Patel in Akshardham, Gandhinagar
Rajendra Gupta as Damodardas Modi

Production 
Initially actor Paresh Rawal was to play Narendra Modi in a biopic that he was also producing. Before that film was materialised, PM Narendra Modi was announced in parallel with Vivek Oberoi selected to play the lead role.

Principal photography 
Filming began on 28 January 2019 in Ahmedabad, Gujarat. Some vital scenes in the film chronicling Modi's early life and political journey was filmed in Uttarkashi district, Uttarakhand. Final schedule of filming was held at Mumbai. Vivek was injured during the shoot while doing a scene in Uttarkashi.

Soundtrack 

The music of the film is composed by Hitesh Modak and Shashi-Khushi while the lyrics are written by Javed Akhtar, Prasoon Joshi, Sameer, Abhendra Upadhyay, Irshad Kamil, Parry G. and Lavraj. Two songs, one Suno Gaur Se Duniya Walon from Salman Khan and Sanjay Dutt starrer a 1997 unfinished film Dus and the other Ishwar Allah from the film 1947: Earth, starring Aamir Khan, Nandita Das and lyrics by Javed Akhtar used in this film.

Initially, Javed Akhtar and Sameer were unaware about their works from old films being reused in this film. They tweeted they have not written any songs for the film after finding their names on the film' credit row. The film's producer Sandip Ssingh clarified that the credits were given because their songs from previous movies were included.

Music Composer Shashi Suman (Shashi-Khushi Duo) collaborated with music producer Meghdeep Bose on songs "Saugandh Mujhe Iss Mitti Ki", "Hindustani" & "Fakeera".

Marketing and release 
National Student's Union of India's Goa unit of the student wing of Congress Party, has written to Election Commission to ban the screening of the film claiming it violates the model code of conduct of elections. A plea filed at the Supreme Court of India to stop the release was rejected. The court said the constitutional body Election Commission is the appropriate authority to address the petitioner's concerns. On 9 April 2019, the film was certified by the CBFC allotting 'U' certificate with run time of 130 minutes. Election commission has stopped the release of the movie till the elections are over saying, "that any biopic 'which has the potential to disturb the level playing field during the elections should not be displayed in the electronic media'". The film was theatrically released in worldwide on 24 May 2019. A new poster of movie has been released a day before of release of movie with tag line "Aa rahe hain dobara, ab koi nahin rok sakta" marking Narendra Modi's victory in 2019 election.

Producers Suresh Oberoi and Sandeep Singh released a first-look poster of the film on 7 January 2019, revealing actor Vivek Oberoi as the eponymous Modi. Media Certification and Monitoring Committee (MCMC), set up by the Election Commission, has served a notice to the producers and T-series over an advertisement which was carried in two hindi newspapers announcing the movie trailer with an image of Narendra Modi.

Reception

Critical response 
The film was panned by critics, who termed it a hagiography and criticized Oberoi's performance.

Ananya Bhattacharya of India Today took note of the film's bias towards the protagonist: "Even the most controversial parts of PM Narendra Modi's life – the Godhra riots – are planted on the Opposition as a way to keep Modi from serving his people". Nandini Ramnath of Scroll.in wrote, "Any insights the movie offers into Modi's rise are inadvertent. The monomaniacal focus on one man above all else will surely be of interest to those who study how cinema can be used for propaganda". Renuka Vyavahare of The Times of India gave the film two and a half stars out of five and criticised the script, opining, "This one is too lopsided for you to appreciate. It leaves a lot unanswered. While it firmly believes ‘Modi ek insaan nahi, soch hai’, we wish the script was as thoughtful". However, she was among the few who appreciated Oberoi's performance- "He gets the mannerisms, accent and tone right and thankfully doesn't overdo it". Writing for The Indian Express, Shubhra Gupta gave the movie two stars out of five and stated, "The film is not a mere bio-pic, it is a full-fledged, unabashed, unapologetic hagiography". Kennith Rosario of The Hindu summarised the movie's narrative as "a obsequious love letter" to the protagonist which tells the audience "how sincere, hardworking, fair and honest Modi is, [and] that it makes you wonder if life is a parody of this film".

The main opposition party of India claimed that the BJP lead government is using bollywood as a propaganda machine and the movie is aimed to serve a perilous mix of high-pitched nationalism and strongman branding of Prime Minister Narendra Modi.

Box office 
The film collected 2.25-2.5 million nett on its opening day, and was the second best-performing film among all others released in India on that day, after Aladdin (2019). The following day, it earned 3 crore nett. Collections on Sunday showed minor growth with earnings of 4.25 crore. Monday earnings dropped 20 percent from the opening day for a total of 1.85 crore nett. On Tuesday, the film earned 1.7 crore nett. The film earned 1.5 crore nett and 1.1 crore nett on Wednesday and Thursday.

The film managed to earn 19.21 crores domestically in its first week. Next 3 weeks gross collections were 7.20 crores, 1.60 crores, and 0.5 crores respectively. Thus, it ended with a life-time collection of 28.51 crores in India.

See also
 7 RCR
 Pradhanmantri
 My Name Is Raga

References

External links 

 
 PM Narendra Modi on Bollywood Hungama
 

2019 films
Indian films based on actual events
Cultural depictions of Narendra Modi
Cultural depictions of Indira Gandhi
Biographical films about politicians
Indian biographical films
Works about the Emergency (India)
2010s biographical films
Nehru–Gandhi family
Tata family
Atal Bihari Vajpayee